Prof. Dewi Fortuna Anwar, M.A, Ph.D (born 22 May 1958 in Bandung) is a scientist, professor, and the Deputy Secretary for Political Affairs to the Vice President of Indonesia. She received her Ph.D from Monash University.

Background

References 

Indonesian women academics
Monash University alumni
People from Bandung
1958 births
Living people